"Slow Suicide" is the fifth single by Scott Stapp, released on October 8, 2013. It is the first single from his second solo album Proof of Life, released on November 5, 2013. It is Stapp's first single to be released since "Surround Me" on October 31, 2006.

Background
Stapp told Wind-Up Newsletter about the song: "I've always been heavy on metaphor and symbols, even to where I might hide behind fanciful language. Howard [Benson] helped me get straight to the point. The point is that for years I was slowly killing myself. Drugs and booze want to kill you instantly, but they’re patient and will take their time. The same is true of toxic relationships. I had to start off this story by declaring the most obvious of truths: that I had been torturing and poisoning myself in an attempt to snuff out my soul." "So many days I choose to suffer, living a lie," the lyrics say. "So many ways I chose to die."

Chart performance

References

 
2013 singles
2013 songs
Scott Stapp songs
Wind-up Records singles
Song recordings produced by Howard Benson
Songs written by Scott Stapp